This is a list of songs about Chicago.

0–9
 "1215 W. Belmont" - Carey Bell & Lurrie Bell
 "19th Street Blues" - Johnny Dodds & Tiny Parham
 "2120 South Michigan Avenue" – Rolling Stones
 "29th and Dearborn" – Richard M Jones
 "31st And State" - Johnny Griffin And Wilbur Ware With Junior Mance
 "39th And Indiana" - Charley Musselwhite
 "42 in Chicago" - Merle Kilgore
 "43rd Street Jump" - David "Honeyboy" Edwards, Sunnyland Slim, Big Walter Horton, Kansas City Red, Floyd Jones 
 "47th Street Stomp" – Jimmy Bertrand's Washboard Wizards
 "5-3-10-4", 2000 – Maybe I'll Catch Fire - Alkaline Trio
 "55th Street" - Lidell Townsell
 "65th and Ingleside" - Chance the Rapper
 "70th & King Drive" – Hot Hanas Hula

A
 "A Cicada Of Chicago" by Pepe Ahlqvist
 "Alpha" - Towa Tei
 "An Afternoon in Midway Plaisance. Fantasie for Piano.", 1893 – composer: Gustav Luders
 "Another Rainy Day in New York City" - Chicago 
 "All We Know" - Chainsmokers
 "Angels" – Chance the Rapper from Coloring Book, 2016 (music video shows him rapping on top of the "L" train)
 "Apex Blues" – Jimmie Noone & His Apex Club Orchestra
 "Apostrophe to Chicago" – composer & lyricist: Mrs. Emily M. (Blakeslee) Boyden
 "Area 312" – Resurrection Band
 "At McKie's" – Sonny Rollins & Coleman Hawkins (McKie's was a famous Chicago jazz venue)
 "Ation" – Frode Gjerstad Trio With Steve Swell
 "Auch Chikago War Einmal Jung" – Katja Ebstein
 "Awake! Awake!" – composer & lyricist: Mrs. Emily M. (Blakeslee) Boyden

B
 "Back Down On State Street" – Ben Sidran
 "Back One Day" - TheFatRat & NEFFEX
 "Back Streets of Lombard" – Ground Zero
 "Back to Chicago" – Styx, from Edge of the Century, 1990
 "Bad, Bad Leroy Brown" – Jim Croce
 "The Ballad Of Jesse James" - various versions - see Jesse James (folk song)
 "Bamako Chicago Express" - Don Moye
 "Baseball Dreams" – Ralph's World
 "Battle of Chicago" – Berkshire Seven
 "Bear Down Chicago Bears" - John Frigo
 "The Belle of Chicago", 1892 – composer: John Philip Sousa
 "The Belle of Chicago Barn Dance" – composer: Theo. Bonheur
 "The Belle of Lincoln Park" – composer & lyricist: Geo. Maywood
 "Best Wishes to your Black Lung" – Less Than Jake
 "Big Bill the Builder" (mayor), 1928 – composers & lyricists: Milton Weil, Bernie Grossman & Larry Shay
 "The Big Brass Band from Brazil" by Art Mooney & His Orchestra 
 "The Big Unit" – The Mountain Goats
 "Big Windy City" - Troy Shondell
 "The Billiken Man", 1909 – composer: Melville J. Gideon; lyricist: E. Ray Goetz; sung by Blanche Ring
 "Black Sox Two Step (Noir Chaussette's Two Step)" – Sidney Brown
 "Blank" - Disfigured 
 "Bloody Canvas", 2021 – Polo G
 "Blowin' in from Chicago", 2005 – composer: Hank Hirsh; Six Perfections Music; Around and Back
 "Blue Line" – Local H
 "Blues for the South Side" – Ronnie Earl
 "Blues for the West Side" – Eddie Shaw
 "Boo’d Up" - Ella Mai
 "Boogie Woogie Bugle Boy" - Andrews Sisters
 "Boost Chicago" – composer: Armin P. Bauer
 "Born in Chicago" – Paul Butterfield 1965, blues
 "Born in Illinois (in a place they call Chicago)" - Mark "Big Poppa" Stampley
 "Bow to the Masta", 1999 – Kool Keith
 "Boy Reporter Blues, Dedicated to Horace Wade – Boy Reporter of the Chicago Evening American", 1924 – composers: Dell Lampe & J. Bodewalt Lampe; lyricist: Haven Gillespie
 "Break Down on Lake Shore Drive" – The Black Dog
 "Bryn Mawr Stomp" – Local H
 "Bucktown Stomp" – Johnny Dodds' Washboard Six
 "The Burning Iroquois" (theater), 1904 – composer: Edward Stanley; lyricist: Mathew Goodwin
 "The Burning of the Iroquois", 1904 – composer: Thos. R. Confare; lyricist: Morris S. Silver
 "Burn It All Down" - PRVIS

C
 "Calling Me Home, Chicago", 1985 – composer: Paul David Wilson
 "Carry On" - Anna Tsuchiya
 "Casimir Pulaski Day" – Sufjan Stevens
 "Calling Me" - Ooyy
 "Caliente" - Farruko, Darell, (Mr Canovas Techno Remix)
 "Can’t Get Enough" - Big Time Rush
 "Cha Cha Chicago" – Kai Winding
 "Chi-Chi-Chi-Chicago" – Nellie Lutcher
 "Chi'-Ca'-Go'" - Johnny Ross
 "Chi-City" – Common, featuring Kanye West, from Be, 2005
 "Chi-City Boogie" - Ricardo Miranda
 "Chi-Town" - Jing Chi
 "The Chi-Town Boogie" - Casey Jones
 "Chi-Town Hustler" – Eddie Floyd
 "Chi-Town Theme" – Cleveland Eaton
 "Chi-Town" – The Cribs
 "Chi-Town" – Da Brat
 "Chi-Town" – Jerry Butler
 "Chi-Town Affair" - DJ Phats
 "The Chi-Town Nightlife" – Paul Johnson
 "Chicago" – ABC
 "Chicago" – Roy Ayers
 "Chicago" – Big D and the Kids Table
 "Chicago" – Birdpaula
 "Chicago" – Bis
 "Chicago" – Capital STEEZ produced by MF DOOM
 "Chicago" - Clueso
 "Chicago" - Colour Club
 "Chicago" - David Morales presents the Red Zone Project
 "Chicago" – Kiki Dee
 "Chicago" – Dynastie Crisis
 "Chicago" – The Doobie Brothers
 "Chicago" – Enuff Z'nuff
 "Chicago" – Flipturn
 "Chicago" – Frédéric François
 "Chicago" - Gabry Fasano (Italian electronic music dance producer/dj) 
 "Chicago" – Gemini One
 "Chicago" – Groove Armada
 "Chicago" – Hieroglyphics
 "Chicago" – Ingram Hill
 "Chicago" – Michael Jackson 2014
 "Chicago" – Alexz Johnson
 "Chicago  – Ivan Kuchin
 "Chicago" - music by Lew Pollack; lyrics by Sidney Clare
 "Chicago" – Luther Allison
 "Chicago" – Manfred Mann's Earth Band
 "Chicago" – The Masterbuilders
 "Chicago" – Mat Kearney
 "Chicago" - Otis Pierce
 "Chicago" – Ted Mulry
 "Chicago (We Can Change the World)" – Graham Nash 1971, (about the 1968 Convention)
 "Chicago" – Des O'Connor
 "Chicago" – Portugal. The Man
 "Chicago" – The Purple Hearts
 "Chicago" – Django Reinhardt
 "Chicago" – Revolutionary Ensemble 
 "Chicago" – Lucy Wainwright Roche
 "Chicago" – Rodgers & Hart
 "Chicago" – Alexander Rosenbaum
 "Chicago..." – Screeching Weasel
 "Chicago" – Shawnna
 "Chicago" – Simoncino
 "Chicago" – Sufjan Stevens
 "Chicago" – The Tossers
 "Chicago" – The Uglysuit
 "Chicago" – Kate Voegele
 "Chicago" – Tom Waits
 "Chicago" – Sean Watkins
 "Chicago" – Andre Williams
 "Chicago - 1926" - Nanette Workman 
 "Chicago 60616" - Kenny and the Kasuals
 "Chicago A"/"Chicago B" – Tirez Tirez
 "Chicago After Dark" – Chicago
 "Chicago Afterwhile" by Country Soul Revue featuring Dan Penn
 "Chicago Allstars Boogie" – Willie Dixon & The Chicago Allstars
 "Chicago at Night" – Spoon
 "Chicago Blues", 1946 – composers: Arthur Crudup, Ransom Knowling, Judge Riley
 "Chicago Blues" – Dion DiMucci
 "Chicago Blues" – Fletcher Henderson
 "Chicago Blues" – Bill Snyder
 "Chicago Blues" - Jim Peterik
 "Chicago Blues" - Oscar Peterson
 "The Chicago Blues" – Sally Roberts
 "Chicago Boogie" - Four Blazes
 "Chicago Bop Stepping" – The Clayton Brothers
 "Chicago Bound Blues", 1923 – composer & lyricist: Lovie Austin
 "Chicago Bound Blues" – Bessie Smith
 "Chicago Bound" – Canned Heat
 "Chicago Bound" – Jimmy Rogers
 "Chicago Boxcar" - Fabulous Poodles
 "Chicago Breakdown" – Gene Ammons
 "Chicago Breakdown" – Big Maceo Merriweather
 "Chicago Breakdown" – Doctor Ross
 "Chicago Bus Stop (Ooh, I Love It)" – Salsoul Orchestra
 "Chicago Buzz" – Junie Cobb
 "Chicago By Night" - Orlando Voorn
 "Chicago Calling" – Cyril Davies
 "Chicago, Chicago" – Lord Invader
 "Chicago, Chicago" - Teddy Phillips and His Orchestra featuring Colleen Lovett
 "Chicago City" – George "Harmonica" Smith
 "Chicago City" - The Monarchs
 "Chicago Concerto" - Bill Snyder
 "The Chicago Conspiracy" – David Peel
 "Chicago Cottage" – The Mirage
 "The Chicago Cyclist March", 1896 – composer: Hans Liné
 "Chicago, Damn" – Bobbi Humphrey
 "Chicago Dancin' Girls" - Curtis Potter
 "Chicago Disco" – Major Lance
 "Chicago Emerald City" – Dave Angel
 "The Chicago Express (March Two-Step)", 1905 – composer: Percy Wenrich
 "Chicago Fanphair '93" – Local H
 "Chicago Flyer" – Meade Lux Lewis
 "Chicago Fog Lift" - Chunky, Novi & Ernie (featuring Lauren Wood)
 "Chicago Function" – Sidney Bechet
 "Chicago Girl" – Roger Whittaker
 "The Chicago Girls' March or Two-Step Dance", 1895 – composer: J. W. Tate
 "Chicago, Glad To Be Back Home" - Louisiana Red
 "The Chicago Glide" – composer: Prof. Joseph Gearen
 "Chicago Green" – The Surfaris
 "Chicago Heights" - Roy Davis Jr.
 "Chicago Here I Come" – Willie Dixon & Johnny Winter 
 "Chicago High Life" – Earl Hines
 "Chicago Hope" - Southampton Ltd (an alias of techno producer Thomas Schumacher)
 "The Chicago Hussar's Quickstep", 1892 – composer: A. H. Rintelman
 "The Chicago Hustle" - Evelyn Thomas
 "Chicago, Illinois" - Ben Verdery
 "Chicago, Illinois" - Bobby Short
 "Chicago, Illinois" - from the film Victor/Victoria, performed by Lesley Ann Warren, written by Leslie Bricusse and Henry Mancini
 "Chicago Institute" – Manfred Mann's Earth Band
 "Chicago Is Alive" – Dicken (of Mr Big)
 "Chicago Is Just That Way" – Eddie Boyd
 "Chicago Is Large" – Nazgul
 "Chicago Is Loaded With The Blues" - Chicago Blues Allstars/Willie Dixon 
 "Chicago Is My Home" – Pierre Lacocque; sung by Lurrie Bell, from album Hattiesburg Blues; Mississippi Heat
 "Chicago Is So Two Years Ago" – Fall Out Boy from album Take This To Your Grave 2003
 "Chicago in Mind" – Albert Ammons
 "Chicago Jackmaster" - K-Alexi 
 "Chicago Light Green" - Jimmy Owens (musician)
 "Chicago Line" - John Mayall
 "Chicago Man" – Eddie Shaw
 "The Chicago March", 1909 – composer: Henry S. Sawyer
 "Chicago Melody" - Axel Zwingenberger
 "Chicago Meltdown" - Impakt
 "Chicago Mess Around" -  Lovie Austin's Blues Serenaders
 "Chicago, Mon Amour" – Made in Sweden
 "Chicago Monkey-Man Blues" – Rosa Henderson
 "Chicago Morning" – Chris Rea
 "Chicago My Home Town" – Barry Goldberg
 "Chicago, My Home Town" – composer & lyricist: Paul S. Hargrow
 "Chicago, New York" – The Aislers Set
 "Chicago North Western" – Juicy Lucy
 "Chicago, Now!" – The Fall
 "Chicago on My Mind" – Albert Ammons
 "Chicago on My Mind" – Jimmy Dawkins
 "Chicago Party Theme" - Jesus Wayne
 "Chicago Post March", 1896 – composer: Ellis Brooks
 "Chicago, Prairie Gem of Illinois" – composer & lyricist: Laura Aborn
 "Chicago Rhythm" - Chicago Stompers
 "Chicago River Blues" - Hayden Thompson
 "Chicago Rockets" - Bourbon Street Barons
 "Chicago Seemed Tired Last Night" – The Hold Steady
 "Chicago, Send Her Home" - Willie Hightower
 "Chicago Serenade" – Eddie Harris
 "Chicago Sidewalk" – Arthur Adams
 "Chicago Slam" - K-Alexi
 "Chicago Slide" – Victoria Spivey
 "Chicago Song" – David Sanborn
 "Chicago Southside" - CZR (house record)
 "Chicago Stomp" - Pinetop Perkins
 "Chicago Stomp Down" – Duke Ellington
 "Chicago Stomps" – Jimmy Blythe
 "The Chicago Story" - Jimmy Snyder
 "Chicago Style" - Dave Specter
 "Chicago Style" - (from Road to Bali)
 "Chicago Surf" - Surf Teens
 "Chicago (That Toddlin' Town)", 1922 – composer & lyricist: Fred Fisher; popularized by Frank Sinatra
 "Chicago, the City of Today" – composer: Bill Snyder; lyricist: Ann Marsters
 "Chicago, the Gem on the Shore", 1923 – composer & lyricist: J. A. Johnson
 "Chicago, the Most Beautiful City" – composer & lyricist: Frank Padula
 "The Chicago Theme (Love Loop)" – Hubert Laws
 "Chicago Tickle" - Harry Tierney
 "Chicago Trane Blues" - Toby Ben
 "The Chicago Tribune Centennial March", 1947 – composer: Robert Trendler; lyricist: Jack La Frandre
 "Chicago Tribune March", 1893 – composer: W. Paris Chambers
 "Chicago Trip" - The Mackenzie
 "Chicago Twist" – Werner Baumgart
 "The Chicago Two-Step" – composer: J. P. Brooks
 "Chicago Wind" – Merle Haggard
 "Chicago Woman" - The Oxfords
 "Chicago Woman" - Sonny Turner & Sound Limited
 "Chicago Women" - Willie James Lyons 
 "Chicago x 12" – Rogue Wave
 "Chicago's Finest" – Emmure
 "Chicago's Gift to a 'Nation's Hero'" (U. S. Grant) 1891 – composer & lyricist: W. C. Robey
 "Chicago's Queen" – Baron Longfellow
 "Chicagoland Twirl Polka" – Frankie Yankovic
 "Christmas in Chicago" – Marilyn Scott
 "Chronically Cautious" - Braden Bales
 "City in a Garden" – Fall Out Boy 2018
 "City Lights" – Lucky Boys Confusion
 "City of CHI" – Juice
 "The City of Chicago" – Luka Bloom, Christy Moore
 "City of Promise. 1934 Century of Progress Song" – composer: Jos. Snabl-Antes; lyricist (Czech text): Vasek Niederle; lyricist (English translation): Libushka Bartusek
 "City in a Garden" - Fall Out Boy
 "Clark Street" – Elmer Bernstein
 "Clean Up Chicago" - Josef Myrow and Mack Gordon 
 "Closer to Our Graves" – Lucky Boys Confusion
 "Cold" - Nightcore (Maroon 5 ft. Future)
 "Cold and Windy Night" – The Fantastic Four
 "Cold Chicago" – Humming House
 "Cold Chicago Wind" - Jack Bonus
 "Cold Chicago Winds" - Country Boys (featuring the Willis Brothers)
 "Cold Windy City of Chicago" – Boxcar Willie
 "Columbia Fair (Grand March)" – composer: Theodore Moelling
 "Columbian Guards March – The Musical Hit of the World's Fair", 1892 – composer & lyricist: T. P. Brooke
 "Columbus Fair (Grand March)" – composer: Geo. Schleiffarth
 "Come On! Feel the Illinoise! – Sufjan Stevens
 "Come to Chicago" – composer: Dorothy Giffey; lyricist: James Andrichen
 "Coming from Chicago' – Angelo D'Onorio
 "Conover March" (dedicated to the officials of the World's Columbian Exposition) 1893 – composer: Ion Arnold
 "Con–" – Frode Gjerstad Trio With Steve Swell
 "Control" - Unknown Brain x Rival
 "Cook County Jail" – Tom Edwards Country Four
 "The Corner" – Common, featuring Kanye West, from Be, 2005
 "The Count On Rush Street" - Shelly Manne Septet, 1951 - composer: Bill Russo
 "Crook County" – Twista, from Mobstability, 1998
 "Cubs in Five" – The Mountain Goats

D
 "Daley's Gone" – Steve Goodman
 "Dancing in the Street", 1964 – Martha and the Vandellas
 "Dead End Street" – Lou Rawls
 "Dead or Alive" - Empara MI & Dreamchild
 "Dear Chicago" – Ryan Adams
 "Dearborn Street Breakdown" – Charles Avery
 "Dearie" - Gordon MacRae & Jo Stafford
 "Dennehy" – Serengeti
 "Destination - Chicago" - Commander Tom
 "Dolls" - Bella Poarch
 "Don't Call On Me" - The Monkees
 “Don’t Let Me Cave In” - The Wonder Years
 “Don’t Tell Em” - Jeremih 
 "Don't Be Shy" - Tiësto & Karol G
 “Don’t You Worry - Black Eyed Peas, Shakira, & David Quetta
 "Down Low (Nobody Has To Know)" (It's A Long Story Mix) - R. Kelly
 "Down on Maxwell Street" - Micky Moody and Paul Williams (British singer)
 "Down On Wabash Avenue" - Josef Myrow and Mack Gordon 
 "Downtown Chicago" - Tangerine Dream
 "Dr. Chicago" – Udo Lindenberg
 "A Dying Cubs Fan's Last Request" – Steve Goodman

E
 "East Chicago Blues" – Sparks Brothers
 "East Wacker Drive" – Phil Barry
 "Electrified" - TheFatRat 
 "End Of Chicago" - Shock Stars
 "An Esthete On Clark Street" – William Russo
 "Enemy" - Imagine Dragons
 "Enough" - NEFFEX
 "Enough" - Charlieonnafriday
 "Everything" – Dawn Xiana Moon
 "Everything Goes On" - Porter Robinson
 "The Eggplant That Ate Chicago", 1967 – Dr. West's Medicine Show and Junk Band
 "The EL" – Rhett Miller
 "El-A-Noy" by Billy Corgan 2004
 "The Elements: Fire", recorded 1966, released 2011 – Brian Wilson
 "Epitaph Of A Small Winner" by Archie Shepp & Chicago Beau
 "Epidemic", 2020 - Polo G from Hall of Fame, drill
 "Everything is Big in Chicago" by Gustave Kerker and Frederic Ranken

F
 "Fair Women of Chicago Waltzes", 1893 – composer: Theo. H. Northrup
 "Far, Far Away" – Wilco
 "Ferris Wheel March", 1893 – composer: Geo. Maywood
 "Ferris Wheel Waltz", 1893 – composer: G. Valisi; lyricist: Harry C. Clyde
 "First Steps", 1993 – composer: Tommy Stinson, from Bash & Pop
 "Fly Away" - TheFatRat
 "Food from Chicago" – Lord Christo
 "The Forest of Love and Romance, Theme song of the Black Forest Village, A Century of Progress Chicago", 1933 – composer: Ernie Kratzinger; lyricist: Charles Kallen
 "Forty-Seventh and State" – Bud Freeman
 "From Chicago to the Sky" – Seventh Avenue
 "From Chicago with Love" – Harlan Howard
 "From London to Chicago" - Wild Bob Burgos (from Matchbox (band)) & The Dreadnoughts 
 "Full Moon" – Common
 "Funeral March in Memoriam, Carter H. Harrison, Mayor of Chicago", 1893, composer: W. Herbert Layon
 "Funk, Chicago Style" - Dick Hyman

G
 "Get Busy" – Mr. Lee
 "The Girl from Chicago" – Benny Bell
 "Git On Up" – Fast Eddie and Sundance
 "Go Cubs Go" – Steve Goodman
 "Go Go Chicago. Wonder City Home of Mine." – composer & lyricist: Clitus M. Wickens
 "Go Go Gadget Flow" – Lupe Fiasco, from Lupe Fiasco's The Cool, 2007
 "GO" – Ofycial & Wade White Owl, featuring Papi
 "Goin' Back to Chicago" – Chet Oliver
 "Goin' Back to Chicago" – Smokey Hogg
 "Goin' to Chicago Blues", 1939 – composer: Count Basie Orchestra, Lou Rawls
 "Goin' to Chicago" – traditional; recorded by Mike Westbrook
 "Golden Ring" – Tammy Wynette & George Jones
 "Gone To Chicago" - The Pied Pipers
 "Goodbye to Guyville" – Urge Overkill
 "Goodnight Chicago" – Rainbow Kitten Surprise
 "Got To Leave Chi-Town" - Chicago Blues A Living History
 "Grand Exposition March" – composer: Louis Falk
 "Grand Terrace Ballroom" - Albert Nicholas, Herb Flemming, Nelson Williams, Benny Waters, Joe Turner (jazz pianist) 
 "Grand Terrace Rhythm" – Bob Crosby
 "Great Big Friendly Town Chicago" – Dora Hall
 "Greater Chicago March" – composer: Jacob Valentine Havener; lyricist: Agner Clark Winkler
 "Green Mill Garden Blues", 1920 – composer: unknown (88 key piano roll)
 "Greetings. Chicago's Official Song. 1833–Chicago–1933" – composer & lyricist: George D. Gaw; transcriber & arranger: Frank Barden
 "Growing Up" – Fall Out Boy, from Fall Out Boy's Evening Out with Your Girlfriend, 2003
 "Guren no Yumiya" - NateWantsToBattle
 "A Guided Tour of Chicago" – The Lawrence Arms, 1999

H
 "Hail Chicago (March)", 1933 – composer: Stanley Kay; lyricist: A. Seaborg
 "Hail to Thee, Chicago" – composer: John E. King; lyricist: Estella A. Johnson-Hunt
 "Hail, Chicago, Hail", 1949 – composer and lyricist: Lesley Kirk
 "Hail, Chicago! Official Song of the Pageant of Progress", 1921 – composer: Bob Allen; lyricist: Ted Turnquist
 "Hands Open"– Snow Patrol
 "Happy Summertime" – R. Kelly, featuring Snoop Dogg, from TP.3 Reloaded, 2005
 "Harder, Better, Faster, Stronger" - Daft Punk
 "Harlem Avenue" by Red Callender
 "Hastings Street" – Blind Blake
 "The Hat He Never Ate" – composer: Ben Harney; lyricist: Howard S. Taylor
 "Hello Chicago Fox-Trot", 1933 – composer: Anthony Misuraca; lyricist: Joseph Argento
 "Hello Chicago" – Topher Jones & Amada, featuring Ido vs. The World
 "Help Me Out" - Maroon 5 and Julia Micheals
 "Highway 55" – The O'Kanes
 "Hitch Hike" – The Rolling Stones, from Out Of Our Heads, 1965; originally by Marvin Gaye
 "Hold Me Closer" - Elton John and Britney Spears
 "Home" – Kanye West
 "Home In Chicago" - Dave Riley And Bob Corritore 
 "Homecoming" – Kanye West, featuring Chris Martin from Graduation, 2008 (charted at #9 on UK Singles, music video features the bean sculpture in Millennium Park)
 "Homesick at Spacecamp" – Fall Out Boy from Take This To Your Grave, 2003
 "Hometown Chicago" - John Parricelli And Stan Sulzmann

I
 "I-94" - Jules Blattner
 "(I've Got the) Old Chicago Blues" – Bob Gentile
 "I Am Proud of Chicago" – composer & lyricist: Ben Schwartzberg
 "I Came Home" – Rhymefest
 "I Dream of Chicago" – Parlours
 "I Got a Mind to Go to Chicago" – Jackie Payne Steve Edmonson Band
 "I Got the Chicago Blues" – Jim Peterik
 "I Left My Mind In Chicago" - Abu Talib (musician)
 "I Love Chicago" - Little Mike and the Tornadoes
 "I Love My Radio (Midnight Radio)" – Taffy
 "I Might Need Security" – Chance The Rapper
 "I Murdered Them In Chicago' - from Glad To See You
 "Ignition" - Brian Tuey
 "I Smell Chicago" by Catfish Hodge
 "I Used to Work in Chicago. I Did But I Don't Anymore", 1944 – composers & lyricists: Larry Vincent & Sunny Skylar
 "(I Want To Go To) Chicago" - R.T. & The Rockmen Unlimited
 "I Was Having A Hard Time In Chicago" - Mike Martin
 "I–94" – Jules Blattner
 "I'll Meet You in Chicago (at the Fair)", 1928 – composers & lyricists: Charlie Harrison & Fred Rose
 "I'm a Ramblin' Man" – Waylon Jennings
 "I'm Dying Tomorrow" – Alkaline Trio
 "I'm from Chicago", 1917 – composer: Leo Edwards; lyricist: Blanche Merrill
 "I'm Going Right Back to Chicago" (Coon Song) 1906 – composer: Egbert Van Alstyne; lyricist: Harry Williams
 "I'm Strong for Chicago" (University of Chicago Songbook) composer unknown, https://www.youtube.com/watch?v=Jfb8Q-569q8
 "Immortals" - Fall Out Boy
 "I've Got All This Ringing in My Ears and None on My Fingers" – Fall Out Boy, from Infinity on High, 2007
 "I've Got To Leave Chi-Town" - Carey Bell & Lurrie Bell
 "In 1933 (Where Will You Be)" – composer & lyricist: Art Kassel; arranger: Charles Adams
 "In Cairo Street: A Characteristic Fantasie for Piano", 1893 – composer: Geo. Schleiffarth
 "In Chicago" – composer & lyricist: Olive Jeane
 "In Old Chicago", 1937 – composers & lyricists: Mack Gordon & Harry Revel
 "In Tha Chi" – Shawnna, featuring Syleena Johnson, from Block Music, 2006
 "In the Ghetto"– Elvis Presley (International number one pop song in 1969)
 "In the Kitchen – Umphrey's McGee from Anchor Drops, 2004, progressive rock
 "Inner Circles of Chicago" – Rodger Wilhoit
 "Into the Chicago Abyss" – Southall Riot
 "Is Chicago, Is Not Chicago" – Soul Coughing
 "Is There Someone Else?" - The Weekend 
 "It's a Cold Winter" – Frankie Knuckles, Chicago house
 "It's a Way They Have in Chicago" (from Sinbad) 1896 – composer: Gustav Lüders; lyricist: M.E. Rourke
 "It's a Way They Have in Chicago" (from the Royal Chef) 1904 – composer: Ben M. Jerome; lyricists: Geo. E. Stoddard & Chas. S. Taylor

J
 "Jackson Park El Train" by Harold Mabern Trio
 "Jackson Park Express" – "Weird Al" Yankovic
 "January Rain” - PRVIS
 "Jazz Music" – Gang Starr (a different song to the group's more famous "Jazz Thing")
 "Jazz Thing" – Gang Starr
 "Jesus Just Left Chicago" – ZZ Top
 "Joe Chicago" – Big Walter Horton
 "Joe Murphy's Farewell To Chicago" – Old Rope String Band
 "Jolly Bears, To Those on the Board of Trade of Chicago. Polka Humoristic", 1880 – composer: Geo. Schleiffarth
 "Jumpin' in the Pump Room" - John Kirby (musician) and his Orchestra 
 "Just Blew in from the Windy City" – Doris Day, 1953
 "Just for Money" – Paul Hardcastle

K
 "Kaibutsu" - AmaLee
 "Keys to the City" – Ministry & Co Conspirators, 2008
 "Kill Bill" - SZA

L
 "Let's Go, Go-Go White Sox" – Walter Jagiello
 "Left & Right" - Charlie Puth and Jong Kook
 "L.A., Goodbye" – The Ides of March
 "Lady From Chicago" - Neal Sharpe
 "Lake Effect Kid" (demo song) – Fall Out Boy, from Welcome to the New Administration, 2008
 "Lake Michigan" – Rogue Wave, 2007
 "Lake Shore Drive" – Aliotta Haynes Jeremiah, 1971
 "Lake Shore Drive" – Art Porter Jr.
 "Lake Shore Drive" – E-Smoove (Eric Miller)
 "Lake Shore Drive" – Gerald Wilson Orchestra 
 "Lake Shore Drive" – The Innocence Mission
 "Lake Shore Drive" – Theo Parrish
 "Lake Shore Drive Boogie" – Lefty Dizz
 "Lake Shore Drive (Chicago Concerto)" - 101 Strings
 "Lake Shore Drive (Slight Return)" – Harris Newman
 "Lake Shore Driving" – Duran Duran 1988
 "Lakefront Blues" - Dan Burley And His Skiffle Boys
 "Lakeshore Cowboy" – Ramsey Lewis
 "The Last Day of the Fair", 1893 – composer: Frank Swain
 "Lawndale Blues" - Eddie Taylor Blues Band
 "LAX to O'Hare" – The Academy Is...
 "Leader of the Band" – Dan Fogelberg (from Peoria)
 "Leavin' Chicago, A.M.F." – Aliotta Haynes Jeremiah
 "Leaving Chicago" – Knockout
 "Lido Shuffle" – Boz Scaggs
 "Lift Every Voice (Take Me Away)" - Mass Order
 "Lift Me Up - Rihanna
 "Light it Up - Robin Hustin x TobiMorrow
 "Lincoln Park Pirates" – Steve Goodman
 "Lily" - Alan Walker, K-391 & Emelie Hollow
 "Little Joe from Chicago", 1930 – composers: Mary Lou Williams, Henry Wells
 "Living in Chicago" – The Bee Gees
 "Lobster And Scrimp" - Timbaland featuring Jay-Z 
 "Logan Square" - – Jimmy McPartland And Art Hodes 
 "London House" – Billy Walker
 "Long Line To Chicago" - Larry Hosford
 "Love to Die" - Slashstreet Boys
 "Lovin's Been Here and Gone to Mecca Flats", 1926 – composer: Jimmy Blythe
 "Lost" - Maroon 5 
 "Lost Again" - Kings Elliot
 "La Vida Es Una - Karol G

M
 "Mama Chicago" – Bonnie Koloc
 "Mama Chicago" – Mike Westbrook
 "The Man from the South with a Big Cigar in his Mouth", 1930 – composers & lyricists: Rube Bloom & Harry M. Woods
 "The March Maroon, University of Chicago March and Two-Step", 1906 – composer: Harry Turner
 "Marching on to Chicago", 1933 – composers & lyricists: Richard Daly, Thomas Parmiter & Clitus Wickens
 "Maxwell Street" – Chris Rea
 "Maxwell Street Boogie" - Rob Hoeke
 "Maxwell Street Shuffle" – Barry Goldberg
 "Mayday" - TheFatRat
 "Me and My Broken Heart - Rixton
 "Mean Old Chicago" - Bob Margolin
 "Mecca Flat Blues", 1924 – composer: Jimmy Blythe; lyricists: Jimmy Blythe & Priscilla Stewart
 "Meet Me in Chicago" – Jimmy McPartland And Art Hodes 
 "Meet Me in Chicago" – Mat Kearney, Buddy Guy from Rhythm & Blues
 "Melancholium" - Aksil Beats
 "Memphis-Chicago Blues" – Julio Finn Band (featuring Memphis Slim)
 "Mercy Me" – Alkaline Trio
 "Miss Chicago (The Great 'Pageant' Song)", 1921 – composer: Edmund Braham; lyricist: W.S. Greelish
 "Moon River" - Jacob Collier
 "Monody" - TheFatRat
 "Mrs. O'Leary's Cow" – Brian Wilson
 "The Motto" - Tiësto & Ava Max
 "Muddy Waters (Little Walter/Lakeshore Theme/Willie D./Otis/Whisper From Theresa's/Walkin' Up Halsted)" – Glen Hall & Gil Evans
 "Must Have Been The Wind" - Alec Benjamin
 "My Kind of Town" – Frank Sinatra, 1964 (nominated for the 1964 Academy Award for Best Original Song)

N
 "New West Side Stroll" - Dave Specter 
 "New York/Chicago" - Mark Imperial
 "New York and Chicago" - music by Albert Von Tilzer; lyrics by Junie McCree
 "New York - London - Paris - Chicago" - Soup
 "New York To Chicago" - Chubby Jackson
 "New York City" - Chainsmokers
 "The Night Chicago Died" – Paper Lace (Billboard Hot 100 #1 hit in 1974)
 "Night In Chicago" - Reeds
 "North to Chicago" – Hank Snow
 "Northside Cadillac" - James Cotton
 "Northwest 222" – Harry Chapin
 "Nothing Beats Chicago/Ocean is Different" – from the musical Marie Christine
 "Nothing is Lost" - The Weekend
 "Nowhere Fast" - Laurie Sargent
 "Never Forget You" - Zara Larsson

O
 "Ode for the opening of the World's Fair. Held at Chicago, 1892" – composer: C. W. Chadwick; lyricist: Harriet Monroe
 "Oh City of a Century" – composer: Eleanor Everest Freer
 "Oh, Yes! Oh, Yes! Oh, Yes! Oh, Yes! The Dancing Girls will give a Show before they Start for Chicago!" from Little Christopher Columbus
 "Oh You Chicago, Oh You New York", 1910 – composer: Albert Von Tilzer; lyricists: Junie McCree & Sydney Rosenfeld
 "The Oldest Living Groupie in Chicago" – Doug Ashdown
 "On a Freezing Chicago Street" – Margot and the Nuclear So and So's
 "On the Midway, or the Jolly Bum, Bum", 1893 – composer & lyricist: Louis Ortenstein
 "On and On" by Cartoon (feat. Daniel Levi)
 "On the South Side of Chicago" – Vic Damone, Freddy Cole
 "One Way Ride (To Chicago)" – Lois Johnson
 "Only in Chicago" – Barry Manilow
 "The Original Chicago Blues", 1915 – composer: James White
 "The Osmosis Suite - Chicago Indian" - System 7 (band)  
 "Our Chicago" (U of C), 1926 – composer & lyricist: Norman Reid
 "Out Running Karma" - Alec Benjamin

P
 "Palmah House Shuffle" (Palmer House Hotel), 1903 – composer: Libbie Erickson
 "Pantin' in the Panther Room" – Fats Waller
 "The Payback" - James Brown
 "Peace Frog" – The Doors
 "Picketlines and Pepperspray" – Silent Film
 "Prairie Song" – Billy Corgan
 "Private Lawns" – Angus & Julia Stone
 "Pulaski at Night" – Andrew Bird
 "Pulaski Day" – Kidd Russell
 "Pump Room" - The Friendly Indians
 "Pump That Body" - Mr. Lee
 "Pump Up Chicago" – Mr. Lee
 "Put the Blame on Mame", 1946 – composers & lyricists: Allan Roberts, Doris Fisher

Q

R
 "Randolph Street Rag" - Chicago Rhythm Kings
 "Real Good Girlfriend" – The Mountain Goats
 "Red Hot Chicago" – Flying High, 1930; composers & lyricists: B.G. DeSylva, Lew Brown & Ray Henderson
 "Red Leaves of October" – Michael Peter Smith
 "Reflections" - Lollia & Stylosa 
 "Relax With Chicago" - K-Alexi
 “Reminding Me (of Sef) - Common (rapper)
 "Richmond, Chicago, Mexico And Home" - Sonny Miller And The Happy Valley Boys
 "Ride My Face to Chicago" – Frank Zappa
 "Ride To Stony Island" - Stony Island Band (from Stony Island (film))
 "Rise Up" - TheFatRat 
 "Rock-Skippin' at the Blue Note" – Duke Ellington
 "Royal Garden Blues" (jazz standard)
 "The Rebirth" – Chapter 13
 "Route 90" - Clarence Garlow
 "Run for Cover" - Gabrielle Aplin
 "Ruined My Life" - Coopex
 "The Runaway Train" - Michael Holliday

S
 "San Francisco" – Alkaline Trio
 "Saying Goodbye" – Every Avenue
 "The Seer's Tower" – Sufjan Stevens
 "She Shook Him in Chicago" – (Madame Sherry 1909) – composer: Karl L. Hoschna; lyricist: Otto Hauerbach
 "She Was Hot" – Rolling Stones
 "She Was in Chicago" – John Lee Hooker
 "She'd Never Leave Chicago" – McKendree Spring
 "The Sheik of Chicago (Mustafa)", 1960 – adaptor & lyricist: Bob Merrill; recorded by the Four Lads and Archie Bleyer
 "The (Shipped) Gold Standard" – Fall Out Boy from Folie a Deux, 2008
 "Shooting Stars" - Bag Raiders
 "Showtime in Chicago" – Joe Jackson
 "Shy-Town" – Gorillaz
 "Si Volvieras a Mi" - Josh Groban
 "Sidewalks of Chicago" – Merle Haggard
 "Side by Side" - Sofia Wylie
 "Silent Night/7 O' Clock News" – Simon & Garfunkel
 "Silver City" – Hey Champ
 "Simple Man" by Wale
 "Slow Down Chicago" – Canasta
 "Snakeheads" – The Mountain Goats
 "Snow but Faster" - Rock Guitare 
 "So Long Toots" – Cherry Poppin' Daddies from Soul Caddy
 "So Long Sentiment" - Celldweller
 "Something from Nothing" – Foo Fighters, 2014
 "Somewhere in Chicago" – Arnold McCuller
 "Somewhere on Fullerton" – Allister
 "Sounds at the Archway" – Eddie Harris
 "Sounds of West Side Chicago" – Jimmy Dawkins & Hip Linkchain
 "South Shore Drive" - Bernard Allison
 "South Shore Drive" - Noble "Thin Man" Watts
 "South Side" – Moby, featuring Gwen Stefani, 2001 (#14 on Billboard Hot 100)
 "South Side Irish" – Arranmore
 "South Side of Chicago" – Eddie Burns
 "South Side Shake" - Dan Burley And His Skiffle Boys
 "South Union" – Lucky Boys Confusion
 "Southbound Ryan" – Dennis DeYoung
 "Southside Boogie" - Dick Hyman
 "Southside Boogie" - James Cotton
 "Southside Chicago Waltz" – Black 47
 "Southside Chicago" – Otis Brown & The Delights
 "Southside Hop" - Left Hand Frank
 "Southside Mojo" – JaGoFF
 "Southside Shuffle" – Art Hodes
 "Southside Stomp" - Ronnie Earl & the Broadcasters
 "Southside Stuff" – Jimmy Yancey
 "South Side To Riverside" - Lurrie Bell
 "Southside" – Common, featuring Kanye West, from Finding Forever, 2007
 "Sorrow" - Aksil Beats 
 "Star Eater" - Daniel Deluxe
 "Star Witness" – Neko Case
 "Startin' for Chicago" – Tracy Nelson
 "State Street Blues" – Synco Jazz Band (featuring Joseph Samuels)
 "State Street Jive" – Cow Cow Davenport
 "State Street" - Peter Gallway
 "State Street" – Sonny Knight
 "State Street" – Sun Ra
 "State Street Samba" – Cook County
 "State Street Special" - Johnny Parker (jazz pianist)
 "State Street Sweet" - Gerald Wilson Orchestra
 "State Street Tomorrow – Theme Song", 1930 – composers: Carelton Colby & Maurice Wetzel from the Radio Station KYW staff
 "Stay Chi" – Juice
 "Stell–" – Frode Gjerstad Trio With Steve Swell
 "Sting" - Fletcher
 "Stockyard Blues" - Floyd Jones
 "Stockyard Strut" - Freddie Keppard
 "Stony Island Band" - Stony Island Band (from Stony Island (film))
 "Stratford-on-Guy" – Liz Phair, 1993
 "Streamline Train" - The Vipers Skiffle Group
 "Strings Of Chicago" - Lidell Townsell 
 "Stuck in Chicago" – Cate Brothers
 "Sunshine in Chicago" – Sun Kil Moon
 "Sunflower" - Post Malone and Swae Lee
 "Super Bowl Shuffle" – Chicago Bears Shufflin' Crew, the 1985 Chicago Bears champions
 "Super Fade" - Fall Out Boy from "Lake Effect Kid EP", 2018
 "Sweet Chicago" – The Original Caste
 "Sweet Home Chicago", 1937 – composer: Robert Johnson; lyricists: Robert Johnson & Roosevelt Sykes, Blues Brothers
 "Sweet Spots" – The Fiery Furnaces
 "Swing Life Away" – Rise Against from Siren Song of the Counter Culture, 2005
 "Switchboard" – Kid Sister

T
 "Take Me Back to Chicago", 1985 – title track on Take Me Back to Chicago by Chicago
 "Take the Time", 1993 – Waiting for the Night by the Freddy Jones Band
 "Talkin' Baseball (Baseball And The Cubs)" – Terry Cashman
 "Taste of Chicago" – Albert Washington
 "Thank You Chicago" - Ricardo Miranda
 "That's That", 2006 – Snoop Dogg featuring R. Kelly (#3 on Hot Rap Songs chart)
 "The Hill I will Die On" - Alec Benjamin 
 "The Way You Felt" - Alec Benjamin 
 "There's No Lights On The Christmas Tree Mother They're Burning Big Louis Tonight" – Alex Harvey
 "This City", 2011 – Patrick Stump featuring Lupe Fiasco from Soul Punk
 "The Humbling River" - Puscifer
 "Thumbs" - Sabrina Carpenter 
 "Ticket to Chicago" – Terry Garthwaite (once of Joy of Cooking)
 "To Chicago With Love" – Lois Johnson
 "Together Forever (Krush Groove 4)" – Run-DMC
 "Tonight, Tonight", 1996 – The Smashing Pumpkins (#4 on Mainstream Rock chart)
 "Tonight Will Last Forever", 2005 – Photographs by Mest
 "The Torture Doctor", 2013 – Alkaline Trio
 "Train to Chicago" – Mike Doughty
 "The Trianon March", 1934 – dedicated to the Chicago Association of Dancing Masters; composer: R. Alexander Campbell
 "True Enough", 2009 – Everything's Easy by Girlyman
 "Turn It Up Again" – Conway Brothers
 "Twilight Serenade", 2005 – Another Ghost by Jason Myles Goss
 "Two Words", 2004 – Kanye West featuring Mos Def, Freeway, and the Boys Choir of Harlem, from The College Dropout

U
 "The University Quickstep", 1865 – inscribed to the President and Friends of the Chicago University; composer: E. M. Shaw
 "Underneath the Streetlights of Chicago", 2019; Riley Smith
 "Unstoppable" - Sia

V
 "Vacation in Chicago" – Cold War Kids
 "Vernon Park" - Lil' Mark
 "Via Chicago", 1999 – Summerteeth by Wilco
 "The Viking March – Captain Andersen's Viking Ship from Norway to the World's Fair", 1893 – composer: H. C. Verner

W
 "Wacker Drive" – Wazmo Nariz
 "Wailin' at the Trianon" – Lionel Hampton
 "Wait" - Maroon 5
 "Warriors" - AJ Michalka
 "We Ride", 1998 – R. by R. Kelly, featuring Jay-Z
 "We're All Crazy in Chicago", 1986 – Jonathon Brandmeier
 "We're Gonna Go to Chicago" – from the musical Marie Christine
 "Werewolf" - Motionless in White
 "Welcome 2 Chicago", 2001 – Abstract Mindstate featuring Kanye West
 "Welcome to Chicago" - Gene Farris (British chart hit in 2003)
 "Welcome to Chicago" – Kill Hannah from Wake Up the Sleepers, 2009
 "Wes Cide Bluze" – Jimmy Dawkins
 "Wes Cide Rock" – Jimmy Dawkins
 "West Side Baby" - Fenton Robinson
 "West Side Bossman" - Otis Grand, Anson Funderburgh, Debbie Davies 
 "West Side Shuffle" – Ronnie Earl & Duke Robillard
 "West Side Woman" - Lurrie Bell
 "Wet the Bed" - Chris Brown
 "Weston's March to Chicago", 1867 – composer: Edward Mack; publisher: S. Brainard & Sons, Cleveland
 "Wheels a-Rolling", 1948 – official song of the Chicago Railroad Fair; composer: Helen Purcell Maxwell; lyricist: Philip Maxwell
 "When the Levee Breaks", 1929 – composers & lyricists: Kansas Joe McCoy and Memphis Minnie; re-worked by Led Zeppelin in 1971
 "When the Wind Blows in Chicago" – writers: Scott Turner, Audie Murphy; performed by both Roy Clark and Bobby Bare in 1964, and Eddy Arnold in 1970
 "When You Meet a Man in Chicago" – from Sugar
 "When You Say You Love Me" - Josh Groban
 "Where We Started" - Lost Sky
 "White Sox Stomp" – Jimmy Yancey
 "Why" - Willow
 "Windy City Blues" - Ernie Hawks And The Soul Investigators
 "Windy City Blues" – Mike Westbrook
 "Windy City Boogie Woogie", c. 1941–1943 – Nat King Cole
 "Windy City Boogie", c. 1950–1954 – J. T. Brown
 "Windy City Hop" – Slim Gaillard
 "Windy City Soul" by Jerry Butler
 "Windy City" – Jack-Tronic
 "Windy City" – Jackie McLean
 "Windy City" – Phish
 "Windy City" - Richard Evans
 "Windy City" – Rodney Franklin
 "Windy City" – The Sweet
 "Windy City" – from Windy City
 "Windy City Blues" - Ernie Hawks & The Soul Investigators 
 "Windy City Stomp" - Rob Hoeke
 "Wine-O From Chicago" - Howard Crockett
 "Winter in Chicago", 2012 – Toil by Flatfoot 56
 "Wish You Well" - PVRIS 
 "The Woman Downstairs", 1998 – Through the Trees by The Handsome Family
 "Woman in Chicago" – Jim Post
 "World's Columbian Exposition Waltz", 1893 – composer: Adelaide Marcelia Gluck
 "The World's Fair or A Voyage to Chicago", 1893 – composer & lyricist: Leonard Gautier

Y
 "Yes Chicago Is... (Suite)" - Gerald Wilson Orchestra
 "You Haven't Seen The U.S.A. Until You've Seen Chicago!" - Dick Marx Orchestra 
 "You Wake Up in the Morning in Chicago", 1915 – composer: Harry Carroll; lyricists: Ballard MacDonald and Coleman Goetz
 "You'll Find 'Em in Chicago" (from The Yankee Regent), 1905 – composer: Ben M. Jerome; lyricists: Chas S. Adelman and I. L. Blumenstock
 "You're Dead", 2001 – From Here to Infirmary by Alkaline Trio
 "Your the Inspiration", 1984 - Chicago 17
 "Your Somebody Else" - Flora Cash

Z
 "Zelda", 2007 – Isn't This Supposed to Be Fun!? by Farewell

Songs about Chicago sport teams
 "All the Way", 2008 – Eddie Vedder
 "Bear Down Chicago Bears", 1941 – composer & lyricist: Jerry Downs
 "Chelsea Dagger", with text modified by Blackhawks' fans, 2006 – composer and lyricist: Jon Fratelli; performers: The Fratellis
 "The Chicago Cubs Song – Hey Hey! Holy Mackerel!", 1969 – composer: John Frigo; lyricist: I. C. Haag
 "Come On You Cubs Play Ball", 1937 – composer & lyricist: Bernard "Whitey" Berquist
 "Cubs on Parade (The Great March and Two-Step)", 1907 – composer: H. R. Hempel; arranger: Jos. Techen
 "The Glory of the Cubs", 1908 – composer: Arthur Marshall; lyricist: F. R. Sweirngen
 "Go Cubs Go", 1984 – composer & lyricist: Steve Goodman
 "Here Come the Hawks", 1968 – composer: J. Swayzee; producer: The Dick Marx Orchestra and Choir
 "Hurrah for the Cubs", 1930 – composer: Burrell Van Buren; lyricist: Betty Douglas
 "Let's Go, Go-Go White Sox", 1959 – composer & lyricists: Captain Stubby and the Buccaneers
 "Super Bowl Shuffle", 1985 – composers: B. Daniels, L. Barry; lyricists: R. Meyer, M. Owens; performers: Chicago Bears Shufflin' Crew, the 1985 Chicago Bears
 "Watch the Cubs Play Ball", 1941 – composer & lyricist: Harry A. Magill
 "Wave the Flag (For Old Chicago)", 1929 – fight song of the University of Chicago; lyricist: Gordon Erickson
 "We're The Cubbies", 2012 – composer, lyricist, and audio engineer: Michael Droste CubsSong.com
 "White Sox Fitted", 2010 – composer & lyricist: Young General
 "The White Sox March", 1907 – composer: T. F. Durand

References

American music history
Chicago in fiction
Chicago-related lists
American jazz songs
Chicago
Music of Chicago